Brasilotyphlus guarantanus is a species of caecilian in the family Caeciliidae. It was described in 2009 from a specimen collected in the north part of Mato Grosso, Brazil.

References

guarantanus
Amphibians described in 2009
Amphibians of Brazil
Endemic fauna of Brazil